The Sanctuary of Our Lady of Graces of Onuva, located in the municipality of La Puebla del Río, province of Seville, region of Andalusia, in Spain, is a Marian shrine that marks the exact place where a young man of his name Jesús José Cabrera claimed to have witnessed several apparitions of the Blessed Virgin Mary and two appearances of Jesus Christ himself.

History of the Marian shrine of Onuva 
The history of the Shrine of Our Lady of Graces of Onuva is directly related to the Marian apparitions received by the young Jesús José Cabrera between 1968 and 1976. The land where the apparitions of Jesus and Mary took place was acquired by the seer and to this land he was given the name of ONUVA, who, like Jesus himself have explained to the seer, means "Land of Mercy".

In one of Her apparitions, the Blessed Virgin Mary allegedly asked to the seer to build a chapel at the site which is today the central part of the shrine and which is venerated the main image of Our Lady of Graces with the Child Jesus. With the passage of time, and even today, the sanctuary was enlarged, so there are already several new places of worship (a monument to the Sacred Heart of Jesus, another to Saint Michael the Archangel, the Stations of the Cross, a Chapel dedicated to Our Lady of Sorrows, etc.) increasing that way the ability to host the pilgrims in the open enclosure.

Actually, there is in the Sanctuary of Onuva a shelter for the poor and disabled people.

Gallery

See also
 Marian apparition
 Shrines to the Virgin Mary
 Catholic Marian church buildings

References

External links 
 Book: "El Mensaje de Onuva"

Shrines to the Virgin Mary
Roman Catholic shrines in Spain